Menyllus was a Macedonian, who was appointed by Antipater to command the garrison which he established at Munychia after the Lamian War, 322 BC. He is said by Plutarch to have been a just and good man, and to have sought as far as possible to prevent the garrison from molesting the Athenians. He was on friendly terms with Phocion, upon whom he in vain sought to force valuable presents. On the death of Antipater, b.c. 319, he was replaced by Nicanor.

Notes

References

Macedonian phrourarchs
4th-century BC Macedonians
Antipatrid generals
Ancient Macedonians in Athens